The 2016 Glasgow World Cup is an FIG World Cup event that was held on 12 March 2016 at the Emirates Arena in Glasgow, Scotland.

Participants

Women 
  Madison Copiak
  Claudia Fragapane
  Enus Mariani
  Elisabeth Seitz
  MyKayla Skinner
  Asuka Teramoto
  Vera Van Pol

Men 
  Christian Baumann 
  David Belyavskiy
  Yu Cen
  Marvin Kimble
  Junho Lee
  Arthur Mariano (aka Nory)
  Daniel Purvis
  Max Whitlock
  Masayoshi Yamamoto

Results

Women's All-Around

Men's All-Around

References 

Glasgow World Cup
Glasgow World Cup
Glasgow World Cup 
Glasgow World Cup
Glasgow World Cup